2,6-Pyridinedicarbothioic acid (PDTC) is an organosulfur compound that is produced by some bacteria. It functions as a siderophore, a small chelating agent with a high affinity for iron. Siderophores are deployed as ion scavengers for microbes. Siderophores solubilize compounds by forming strong complexes. PDTC is secreted by the soil bacteria Pseudomonas stutzeri and Pseudomonas putida.

Synthesis and biosynthesis
PDTC can be synthesized by treating the pyridine-2,6-dicarboxylic acid (or its diacid dichloride) with H2S in dry pyridine:
NC5H3(COOH)2 +  2 H2S  →   NC5H3(COSH)2  +  2 H2O

This produces an orange 1:1 pyridinium salt of 2,6-pyridinedicarbothioate. Treatment of this salt with acid give PDTC, which can then be extracted with dichloromethane.

The biosynthesis of PDTC remains unclear although some insights can be deduced from the genetics.  It is suggested that Pseudomonas stutzeri may have acquired at least one of the genes by lateral transfer from mycobacteria. In a proposed biosynthetic sequence pyridine-2,6-dicarboxylic acid, a known bacterial metabolite, is activated as its bis-adenosine monophosphate (AMP) derivative. The sulfur donor and its activation remain uncertain.

Coordination chemistry
PDTC binds to both Fe2+ and Fe3+. The ferric complex is brown, whereas the ferrous complex is blue. In the presence of air, the ferrous complex oxidizes to the ferric compound. It is iron selective as only the Fe complex is soluble in water. PDTC is produced mainly during the exponential phase of bacterial growth. The conditions at which Pseudomonas produces PDTC is 25 °C, pH=8 and sufficient aeration.

See also 
 Dipicolinic acid

References

Organosulfur compounds
Pyridines